Richard Mico  (also Micoe, Micho, Meco, Myco; 1590–1661) was an English composer. He was born in Taunton, Somerset, the eldest of three sons of Walter Mico. The family, originally called "Micault", had immigrated to England from France several generations earlier. The Micos were a merchant family: the composer's cousin was Sir Samuel Mico (1610–65), who settled in London by the 1630s, made his fortune in overseas trade to become an alderman of London and Master of the Mercers’ Company, and was knighted after the Restoration.

Mico was appointed resident musician at Thorndon Hall, Essex, in 1608. There, he worked for Sir William Petre (William Byrd's former patron) as a music teacher for the family's children, as well as composing for the household. Surviving documents record the handing over of the household instruments to Mico in 1608, including five viols (with bows), a lute, organ and virginals. While working for Petre, Mico adopted his employer's faith, converting to Roman Catholicism.

In 1630 he was appointed as organist to Queen Henrietta Maria, wife of Charles I, and held this post until the queen's flight to Holland in 1642.

He was buried at St Paul's, Covent Garden, on 10 April 1661.

None of Mico's consort works were published during his lifetime, but Christopher Simpson, writing six years after his death, named him as one of the best composers of fantasias.

Works
Manuscript Mus. 517-20 in the library of Christ Church, Oxford is a set of four partbooks containing instrumental works by Richard Mico (as well as those by Alfonso Ferrabosco, John Ward and John Jenkins). The copyist is unidentified, English, 1630-50. This collection includes 17 of Mico's fantasias for four viols.
All of Mico's known surviving works have been published in the Musica Britannica series: Musica Britannica, Volume 65; Richard Mico: Consort Music, 1994, edited by Andrew Hanley. Published by, Stainer & Bell Ltd, London. .:
Four fantasies à2
Seven fantasies à3 with organ
17 fantasies à4
Four fantasies à5
Four pavans à4
Three pavans à5
An In Nomine à5
Latral à5

Recordings
Phantasm: Still Music of the Spheres; Consorts by William Byrd and Richard Mico, Simax, PSC1143
Amsterdam Loeki Stardust Quartet: Fantazia, Channel Classics Records CCS 16998 includes Mico's Pavan No.1 in C minor and Pavan No. 4 in C major

External links

Bibliography
J. Bennett and P. Willetts: ‘Richard Mico’, Chelys, vii (1977), 24–46
J. Bennett: ‘Byrd and Jacobean Consort Music: a Look at Richard Mico’, Byrd Studies, ed. A. Brown and R. Turbet (Cambridge, 1992), 129–40
A. Hanley: ‘Mico and Jenkins: “Musitians of Fame under King Charles I”’, John Jenkins and his Time, ed. A. Ashbee (Oxford, 1996), 161–9
R. Thompson: ‘A Further Look at the Consort Music Manuscripts in Archbishop Marsh's Library, Dublin’, Chelys, xxiv (1995), 3–18

References

17th-century English composers
English male composers
1590 births
1661 deaths
People from Taunton
17th-century male musicians